The 1996 United States House of Representatives elections in Kansas were held on November 5, 1996 to determine who will represent the state of Kansas in the United States House of Representatives. Kansas has four seats in the House, apportioned according to the 1990 United States Census. Representatives are elected for two-year terms.

Overview

References 

1996 Kansas elections
Kansas
1996